= Samuel Mendelsohn (inventor) =

Samuel Mendelsohn (March 3, 1895 – February 1, 1966) was an American inventor credited with the invention of synchronized flash photography. The New York Times said that his invention "opened a new era in photojournalism".
